Bengaluru Contonment railway station, commonly known as Bangalore Cantonment railway station (station code: BNC) is one of the three important railway stations serving the city of Bangalore and it is located in the locality of Vasanth Nagar and nearby to Shivajinagar. The Station started operations in 1864, with the launch of the Bangalore Cantonment – Jolarpettai train services by the Madras Railway. The train line was broad-gauge and 149 km long, connecting the Bangalore Cantonment with Vellore district.
A total of 119 passenger trains start/end/pass through Bangalore Cantonment railway station.
Total 499 stations are directly connected to Bangalore Cantonment railway station via these 269 passenger trains.

Facilities 
Amenities available at the station include Passenger Reservation Centre (PRS), Waiting halls, AC VIP lounge, enquiry counters, essential stalls, Food plaza, ATM along with the other basic facilities. Hand trolley facility are provided to porters for carrying luggage of passengers with no change in fare charged by the porters.

Considering the need of medical services at the station by Bengaluru Division of the South Western Railway opened a clinic in February, 2014 which would provide free emergency medical services for the train travellers.

In the future, the Namma Metro's Pink Line will connect the Cantonment Railway station between Kalena Agrahara and Nagawara. A skywalk is proposed to connect the metro station with the railway station.

Expansion 
Bengaluru Cantonment station got a face lift with the remodelled entrance and ticketing counter behind the platform 2 which was opened to public in January 2011 by K Muniyappa, Union minister of state for railways.

Trains 
Chennai–Bangalore Double Decker Express has a stop at Bengaluru Cantonment railway station. Following is the table of list of trains passing through Bangalore Cantonment station every day.

See also 
Bangalore East railway station
Bangalore City railway station
Yeshvantapur railway station

References

External links 

Bangalore Civil and Military Station
Railway stations in Bangalore
Bangalore railway division